Brandon Holt (born April 6, 1998) is an American professional tennis player. Holt had an ATP singles ranking of World No. 191 as of 30 January 2023. He also had a career-high doubles ranking of World No. 473, achieved on 10 February 2020.

Career

2022-23: US, Australian Major & Indian Wells Masters debuts, first ATP & Major wins
Ranked No. 303, Holt made his Grand Slam debut at the 2022 US Open as a qualifier after defeating Dimitar Kuzmanov in the last round of qualifying. He won his first Grand Slam level match, upsetting 10th seed Taylor Fritz. This was also Holt's first career win on the ATP Tour.

In January 2023, Holt qualified and made his debut at the 2023 Australian Open. He recorded his first win at this Major after defeating fellow qualifier Aleksandar Vukic.

He made his main draw debut at the Masters 1000 in Indian Wells as a wildcard.

Personal life
Holt is the son of Tracy Austin, a former WTA World No. 1 and two-time US Open Women's Singles champion.

ATP Challenger and ITF Futures/World Tennis Tour finals

Singles: 9 (7–2)

Doubles: 6 (5–1)

Junior Grand Slam finals

Doubles: 1 (1 runner-up)

References 

American male tennis players
1998 births
Living people
Tennis people from California
USC Trojans men's tennis players

External links